The Emblem of Punjab is the official state emblem of Punjab state in India and is used as the official symbol of the Government of Punjab.

Design
The emblem of Punjab consists of the encircled Lion Capital of Ashoka (depicting ancient Ashoka-era heritage found at Sanghol) with a Wheat stem above it and crossed Swords below it. Around the lion capital is written the legend "Government of Punjab" in the English, Hindi and Punjabi languages.

Historical emblems
During British rule in India, the undivided province of Punjab was granted a coat of arms. These arms consisted of a purple shield charged with a sun rising over five rivers in silver. The motto translated at "Let it grow from the rivers"  The name "Punjab" means land of five rivers.

Former princely states in Punjab

Government banner
The government of Punjab can be represented by a banner depicting the emblem of the state on a white background.

See also
 Nishan Sahib
 Khanda
 National Emblem of India
 List of Indian state emblems

References

External links
Punjab emblem details at Hubert de Vries

Government of Punjab, India
Punjab
Punjab
Punjab